Mother Earth was an American anarchist journal that described itself as "A Monthly Magazine Devoted to Social Science and Literature". Founded in early 1906 and initially edited by Emma Goldman, an activist in the United States, it published articles by contemporary activists and writers in Europe as well as the US, in addition to essays by historic figures.

History
Emma Goldman, a noted political activist in the United States, was the first editor of this magazine, which she founded in early 1906. She wanted an alternative means to reach people, as she was tired of her rounds of cross-country speaking tours. Alexander Berkman, another well-known anarchist and longtime friend, took over as editor in 1907, a year after he was released from prison. He served in this role to 1915. It published longer articles by American and European writers and activists on a variety of anarchist topics, including the labor movement, education, literature and the arts, state and government control, and women's emancipation, and sexual freedom. It was an early supporter of birth control. Its subscribers and supporters formed a virtual "who's who" of the radical left in the United States in the years prior to 1920. One of its traveling sellers was a friend of Goldman and Mother Earth circles, Eva Kotchever, who founded later the famous speakeasy Eve's Hangout in New York.

In 1917, Mother Earth began to call for opposition to US entry into the Great War and, specifically, for men to refuse to register for the military draft or submit to conscription. On June 15, 1917, Congress passed the Espionage Act. The law set punishments for acts of interference in US foreign policy and espionage. The Act authorized stiff fines and prison terms of up to 20 years for anyone who obstructed the military draft or encouraged "disloyalty" to the U.S. government. After Goldman and Berkman continued to advocate against conscription, Goldman's offices at Mother Earth were thoroughly searched by Department of Justice agents, and they seized volumes of files and detailed subscription lists from Mother Earth, along with Berkman's journal The Blast.

A US Justice Department press release said:

A wagon load of anarchist records and propaganda material was seized, and included in the lot is what is believed to be a complete registry of anarchy's friends in the United States. A splendidly kept card index was found, which the Federal agents believe will greatly simplify their task of identifying persons mentioned in the various record books and papers. The subscription lists of Mother Earth and The Blast, which contain 10,000 names, were also seized.

Mother Earth remained in monthly circulation until August 1917. Berkman and Goldman were found guilty of violating the Espionage Act because they encouraged men to resist the draft. The court had revoked Goldman's citizenship after that of her husband, Kershner, had been revoked. Along with 258 others, Goldman and Berkman were deported to the Soviet Union on a single ship in 1919.

Contributors
The following is a partial list of contemporary contributors whose essays or poems were published in Mother Earth:

The following is a partial list of contributors of cover art:

 Jules-Félix Grandjouan
 Manuel Komroff
 Robert Minor
 Man Ray
 Adolf Wolff

References

External links

 
 

Anarchist periodicals published in the United States
Monthly magazines published in the United States
Defunct political magazines published in the United States
Defunct magazines published in the United States
Emma Goldman
Magazines established in 1906
Magazines disestablished in 1917
Magazines published in New York City
1906 establishments in the United States